John Manners may refer to:

Dukes
 John Manners, 1st Duke of Rutland (1638–1711)
 John Manners, 2nd Duke of Rutland (1676–1721)
 John Manners, 3rd Duke of Rutland (1696–1779)
 John Manners, 5th Duke of Rutland (1778–1857)
 John Manners, 7th Duke of Rutland (1818–1896), better known as Lord John Manners in his role as a 19th-century statesman
 John Manners, 9th Duke of Rutland (1886–1980)

Other nobles
 John Manners, 4th Earl of Rutland (c. 1552 – 1588)
 John Manners, 8th Earl of Rutland (1604–1679)
 John Manners, Marquess of Granby (1721–1770) an 18th-century military officer, son of the 3rd Duke of Rutland

Others
 John Manners (died 1438), MP for Northumberland (UK Parliament constituency)
 John Manners (died 1611), MP for Nottinghamshire (UK Parliament constituency)
 John Manners (MP) (1730–1792), politician
 Hon. John Manners Tollemache (c. 1768 – 1837), born John Manners, son of the above
 John Manners (American politician) (1786–1853), physician and President of the New Jersey Senate
 J. Hartley Manners (1870–1928), British playwright
 John Manners (cricketer) (1914–2020), British naval officer and cricketer
 John Neville Manners (1892–1914), played cricket for Eton College

See also
 John Manners-Sutton (disambiguation)